Doug Struyk (born August 1, 1970) is a former Iowa State Representative from the 99th District. He served in the Iowa House of Representatives from 2003 to 2011 and was an assistant minority leader.  He resigned from the Iowa House in 2011 to work for the Iowa Secretary of State's office.  Struyk received his B.A. from Iowa State University and his J.D. from Creighton University School of Law. He is vice president of his family's Council Bluffs, Iowa, lawn care business.

During his last term in the Iowa House, Struyk served on the Agriculture, Commerce, Judiciary, and Ways and Means committees, as well as serving as ranking member of the State Government Committee.

Struyk was first elected to the Iowa House in 2002 as a Democrat, defeating Republican opponent Stan Grote in the general election.  On March 18, 2004, Struyk announced that he was switching parties to become a Republican, the announcement coming a day before the primary filing deadline.  He won re-election as a Republican, defeating Democratic opponent David Phillips in the general election.  He did not seek re-election to the Iowa House in 2010, instead taking a job with Iowa Secretary of State Matt Schultz as a policy advisor and legal counsel.

Electoral history
*incumbent

References

External links

Representative Doug Struyk official Iowa General Assembly site
 
Profile at Iowa House Republicans

Republican Party members of the Iowa House of Representatives
Living people
Creighton University School of Law alumni
Iowa State University alumni
1970 births
Politicians from Council Bluffs, Iowa
Politicians from Omaha, Nebraska
Iowa lawyers
Lawyers from Omaha, Nebraska